Luis Fernando Amaya Medellín (born 11 June 1997) is a Mexican footballer who plays as a midfielder for UAT.

References

1997 births
Living people
Mexican footballers
Association football midfielders
Correcaminos UAT footballers
La Paz F.C. (Mexico) footballers
Ascenso MX players
Liga Premier de México players
Tercera División de México players
Footballers from Tamaulipas
People from Ciudad Victoria